Mamadawerre is an Aboriginal outstation located in the West Arnhem region of the Northern Territory, Australia. It is located about 307km east of Darwin, on Kunwinjku land. Though there was no recorded population at the time of the 2016 census, the settlement may have a seasonally intermittent population of around 15-30 people.

References